The Negro’s Church (New York: Institute of Social and Religious Research, 1933) is a book that is 321 pages long and consists of seventeen chapters.  The book highlights the origins of African-American religion in the region studied and how it became a way to cope in times of oppression. As phrased in the study, the songs, hymns, and dances of that culture were a way to “endure suffering and survive as it helped blacks get through heartache with the music of the soil and the soul”. The authors claim that the Negro church, even before emancipation, was the one place where African Americans had opportunities for leadership and liberties like freedom of self-expression. The authors state that besides teaching, “preaching and ministry” was one of the only black jobs considered acceptable by most whites, as they viewed it as a non-threatening demonstration of the spirit of God. The book focuses on the church's huge role in providing black culture with a voice on all levels: economically, socially, and politically.

Chapter VI (titled “The Message of the Minister”) provides in-depth information regarding the educational aspect of the Church. The authors performed a systematic study of 100 sermons in order to evaluate the "teaching quality" by the minister in each Negro church. They separated the sermons into “three classes: those that touch on life situations, sermons that are doctrinal or theological, and those that are predominantly other-worldly”. They then critiqued every one of the 100 sermons and worked to further classify them. The Negro's Church deplores the fact that these sermons didn’t address the spiritual aspects of the world in conjunction with the political, economic, or racial. The sermons were primarily an adjustment focusing on other-worldliness, but understanding more about the practical and how that relates to major life struggles of the black Negro politically and economically would further educate the black body as a whole. Mays and Nicholson went on to say that, with rising numbers of young blacks entering the ministry, it is important to increase awareness of these facts so as to foster improvements.

The authors claim that despite these faults, the "Negro Church" is still a powerful force for the people they studied. Although there are so many issues and areas for improvement in the Negro church, the church’s power is invested in what it allows the black population to do. In society, the church is the first area that blacks can finally control and have ownership of. “The opportunity found in the Negro church to be recognized, and to be “somebody,” has stimulated the pride and persevered the respect of many Negroes who would have been entirely beaten by life, and possibly completely submerged”. The authors conclude by expressing their opinion that the Negro church ultimately serves as a home and social center and is key to how blacks stay grounded in a society that constantly belittles their worth.

Footnotes 

The book was reprinted by Russell & Russell, 1969; and Arno Press, 1969

External links
The Negro's Church on Google Books
Digitized version from the University of Michigan

1933 non-fiction books